, previously known as , is a Japanese actress, voice actress and singer from Chiba Prefecture, Japan. Some of her major roles are Nagisa Saitou in Squid Girl, Sakura Nankyoku in Penguin Musume,  Uta Yumeno in Onegai My Melody, Kotono Hayama in Saint October, Mion Takamine in Pretty Rhythm. She, along with Kana Asumi and Sayuri Hara were part of a voice actress singing group called Lisp which performed anime theme songs for Haiyoru! Nyaruani: Remember My Mr. Lovecraft, Pretty Rhythm Aurora Dream, and Bakugan Battle Brawlers: Gundalian Invaders in Japan. She has also released an album called Sweets Paradise and a single called "Diamond Sparkle" which was a theme song for Sky Girls. She is currently a member of Still Wood Garden.

Filmography

Anime

Discography

Albums

Singles

DVDs
 Sweet Box (2008)

References

External links
   
  
 
 Azusa Kataoka, Azusa Enoki at Oricon 

1988 births
Living people
Japanese musical theatre actresses
Japanese video game actresses
Japanese voice actresses
Voice actresses from Chiba Prefecture
81 Produce voice actors